Kilo is a decimal unit prefix in the metric system denoting multiplication by one thousand (103). It is used in the International System of Units, where it has the symbol k, in lowercase.

The prefix kilo is derived from the Greek word , meaning "thousand". 

In 19th century English it was sometimes spelled chilio, in line with a puristic opinion by Thomas Young. As an opponent of suggestions to introduce the metric system in Britain, he qualified the nomenclature adopted in France as barbarous.

Examples 
 one kilogram (kg) is 1000 grams
 one kilometre (km) is 1000 metres
 one kilojoule (kJ) is 1000 joules
 one kilolitre (kL) is 1000 litres
 one kilobaud (kBd) is 1000 baud
 one kilohertz (kHz) is 1000 hertz
 one kilobit (kb) is 1000 bits
 one kilobyte (kB) is 1000 bytes
 one kiloohm is (kΩ) is 1000 ohms
 one kilosecond (ks) is 1000 seconds
one kilotonne (kt) is 1000 tonnes

By extension, currencies are also sometimes preceded by the prefix kilo-:
 one kiloeuro (k€) is 1000 euros
 one kilodollar (k$) is 1000 dollars

kilobyte
For the kilobyte, a second definition has been in common use in some fields of computer science and information technology. It uses kilobyte to mean 210 bytes (= 1024 bytes), because of the mathematical coincidence that 210 is approximately 103. The reason for this application is that digital hardware and architectures natively use base 2 exponentiation, and not decimal systems. JEDEC memory standards still permit this definition, but acknowledge the correct SI usage.

NIST comments on the confusion caused by these contrasting definitions: "Faced with this reality, the IEEE Standards Board decided that IEEE standards will use the conventional, internationally adopted, definitions of the SI prefixes", instead of kilo for 1024.  To address this conflict, a new set of binary prefixes has been introduced, which is based on powers of 2. Therefore, 1024 bytes are defined as one kibibyte (1 KiB).

Exponentiation
When units occur in exponentiation, such as in square and cubic forms, any multiplier prefix is considered part of the unit, and thus included in the exponentiation.
 1 km2 means one square kilometre or the area of a square that measures 1000 m on each side or 106 m2 (as opposed to 1000 square meters, which is the area of a square that measures 31.6 m on each side).
 1 km3 means one cubic kilometre or the volume of a cube that measures 1000 m on each side or 109 m3 (as opposed to 1000 cubic meters, which is the volume of a cube that measures 10 m on each side).

See also
 milli- (inverse of kilo- prefix, denoting a factor of 1/1000)
 kibi- (binary prefix, denoting a factor of 1024)
 RKM code

References

SI prefixes
1000 (number)

he:תחיליות במערכת היחידות הבינלאומית#קילו